The Rights and Resources Initiative (RRI) is a non-governmental organization working to encourage forest tenure and policy reforms and the transformation of the forest economy so that business reflects local development agendas and supports local livelihoods. RRI works at the country, regional and global levels, collaborating on research, advocacy and convening strategic actors.

The RRI Coalition is formed by a group of core partners who work in areas of their regional and thematic expertise. Partners also engage with a wide group of Collaborators who participate in and support RRI activities. The Initiative's 14 partners and 140 plus collaborator organizations are directly engaged in land and forest policy reforms in close to 20 countries throughout Africa, Asia, and Latin America. Together, they are working to encourage greater global commitment and action on pro-poor tenure, policy and market reforms.

This strategic coalition goes beyond the traditional set of international development actors to involve a wide spectrum of organizations, each of which provides a critical perspective in the larger chain of actors necessary to advance change.

The Rights and Resources Initiative was formally established in 2005 by the Coordinating Association of Indigenous and Community Agroforestry in Central America (ACICAFOC), the Center for International Forestry Research (CIFOR), Forest Trends, the Foundation for People and Community Development Papua New Guinea (FPCD), the International Union for Conservation of Nature (IUCN), and RECOFTC - The Center for People and Forests. In 2006, the Forest Peoples Programme, HELVETAS Swiss Intercooperation, and the World Agroforestry Centre joined as RRI Partners. Civic Response joined in 2007, Federation of Community Forest Users Nepal (FECOFUN) joined in 2008, and the Samdhana Institute joined in January 2009. In late 2010, the Indigenous Peoples' International Centre for Policy Research and Education (Tebtebba) joined, followed by International Forestry Resources and Institutions (IFRI), the Salvadoran Research Program on Development and Environment (PRISMA), and the Centre for Environment and Development (CED) in 2011. The coalition is headquartered in Washington, D.C.

Mission
RRI’s Mission is to support local communities’ and indigenous peoples’ struggles against poverty and marginalization by promoting greater global commitment and action towards policy, market and legal reforms that secure their rights to own, control and benefit from natural resources, especially land and forests.

Activities
RRI pro-actively engages with governments, civil society and community organizations to encourage institutional reforms, advance new understanding of threats and opportunities, encourage innovative and promising new models of forest tenure and enterprise, and catalyze more effective intervention on tenure and governance.

Governance
The Rights and Resources Initiative is governed by the Board of Directors, which meets three times a year. The Board also receives input on governance of the RRI from regular meetings of the Partners, which often take place simultaneously with meetings of the Board.

The coalition is coordinated and supported by the Rights and Resources Group, a small organization that serves as the coordination mechanism for the Rights and Resources Initiative. Rights and Resources Group is a non-profit 501(c)(3) organization located in Washington, DC.

Current coalition partners
 Centre for Environment and Development, Cameroon
 CIFOR
 Civic Response
 FECOFUN Nepal
 Forest Peoples Programme
 Forest Trends
 Helvetas
 IFRI
 Landesa
 ONAMIAP
 PRISMA
 Samdhana Institute
 Tebtebba
 World Agroforestry Centre

External links
 Rights and Resources Initiative Website

Sustainability organizations
Indigenous rights organizations
Human rights organizations based in the United States
Environmental organizations based in Washington, D.C.
Forest conservation organizations